The Leicester Hunters were a  motorcycle speedway team which operated from 1948 until 1962.

History
Speedway had operated before the war at both Leicester Stadium and the Leicester Super track. Speedway was proposed to return to Leicester in 1948 at Leicester Stadium, led by A. D. Sanderson with Roy Dook and later Bob Peett managing the team, but concerns from local residents over noise levels delayed the return until the following year, with the newly formed team limited to away challenge matches in 1948. To go with the team name, the riders wore hunting pink race bibs featuring a gold horseshoe. The Hunters joined the National League in Division 3, where they finished 10th. Former rider Cyril "Squib" Burton, who had been one of the top riders of the Leicester Stadium team in the early 1930s, took over as manager in 1950 and the team joined division 2 at the end of the season, after finishing in third place. 

The team spent six seasons in division 2 and by 1957, the dwindling number of teams meant that the National League operated as a single division and the Hunters stayed in the top division until 1961, their best placing being as runners up in 1959. Mike Parker then took over the club, and opted to join the Provincial League in 1962, finishing in 12th position. This was to be the Hunters' final season, with the team transferring to Long Eaton for the 1963 season.
Speedway returned to Leicester Stadium for a period but the team were renamed Leicester Lions.

Notable riders
Notable Hunters riders include Ken McKinlay, who was the team's top rider for eight seasons between 1954 and 1961, Harwood Pike, Len Williams, Charlie Barsby, Paweł Waloszek, Harry Bastable, Jack Geran, Ivor Brown, and Norman Hunter.

Season summary

See also
Speedway in Leicester

References

Sport in Leicester